Andrew Gregory (born 8 October 1976) is an English former professional footballer who played in The Football League for Barnsley and Carlisle United.

References

English footballers
Barnsley F.C. players
Carlisle United F.C. players
English Football League players
1976 births
Living people
Association football forwards